111 Battalion was a motorised infantry unit of the South African Army.

History

Origin of the black battalions
By the late 1970s the South African government had abandoned its opposition to arming black soldiers.

In early 1979, the government also approved a plan to form a number of regional African battalions, each with a particular ethnic identity, which would either serve in their respective homelands or under regional SADF commands.

The Swazi Battalion
This policy led to the formation of 111 Battalion for Swazis. 111 Battalion was raised in 1980 at Amsterdam, Mpumalanga on the Swaziland Border in the then Eastern Transvaal where a purpose built base was developed for it.

Troops for 111 SA Battalion were recruited from the self-governing territory of KaNgwane, where the SADF itself maintained a base.

Higher Command
111 Battalion resorted under the command of Eastern Transvaal Command based in Nelspruit.

Operational Deployment
The battalion was responsible for patrolling the border between Swaziland and South Africa.

Disbandment
111 Battalion was disbanded around 1999.

Insignia 
The badge was designed to represent the head ring and plumes of the Swazi King upon crossed assegais.

Leadership

Notes

Peled, A. A question of Loyalty Military Manpower Policy in Multiethinic States, Cornell University Press, 1998,  Chapter 2: South Africa: From Exclusion to Inclusion

References

Infantry battalions of South Africa
Military units and formations of South Africa in the Border War
Military units and formations established in 1980
Military units and formations disestablished in 1994